Adama Jammeh (born 10 June 1993) is a Gambian sprinter. He competed in the 200 metres at the 2015 World Championships in Beijing without advancing from the first round.

Competition record

1Disqualified in the final
2Did not finish in the semifinal

Personal bests
Outdoor
100 metres – 10.25 (+0.9 m/s, Montgeron 2016)
200 metres – 20.58 (-0.3 m/s, Remire Montjoly 2016)

References

External links
 

1993 births
Living people
Gambian male sprinters
World Athletics Championships athletes for the Gambia
Place of birth missing (living people)
Athletes (track and field) at the 2015 African Games
Athletes (track and field) at the 2016 Summer Olympics
Athletes (track and field) at the 2018 Commonwealth Games
Olympic athletes of the Gambia
Athletes (track and field) at the 2019 African Games
Commonwealth Games competitors for the Gambia
African Games competitors for the Gambia